Missed approach is a procedure followed by a pilot when an instrument approach cannot be completed to a full-stop landing. The instructions for the missed approach may be assigned by air traffic control (ATC) prior to the clearance for the approach. If ATC has not issued specific instructions prior to the approach and a missed approach is executed, the pilot must follow the (default) missed approach procedure specified for the approach. Prior to commencing the approach, pilots can make a specific request to ATC if a missed approach may occur. Such a request may include heading and altitude instructions to avoid in-flight delays (such as holds) and efficiently maneuver the aircraft into position for either its next approach or a diversion to an alternate airport.

Generally, if a pilot determines by the time the aircraft is at the decision height (for a precision approach) or missed approach point (for a non-precision approach), that the runway or its environment is not in sight, or that a safe landing cannot be accomplished for any reason, the landing approach must be discontinued and the missed approach procedure (a "go-around") must be immediately initiated. It is also common for pilots to practice a missed approach as part of initial or recurrent instrument training. In such cases, a pilot may execute multiple instrument approaches in a row, with missed approaches between them.

The missed approach procedure normally includes an initial heading or track to follow, and altitude to climb to, typically followed by holding instructions at a nearby navigation fix. The pilot is expected to inform ATC by radio of the initiation of the missed approach as soon as possible. ATC may simply acknowledge the missed approach call or modify the missed approach instructions, for example, with vectors to another fix. ATC may subsequently clear the flight for another approach at the same airport or clear it to an alternative airport, depending on the pilot's intentions as well as fuel, weather and traffic considerations.

References
 

Types of final approach (aviation)